is a Japanese football player for Albirex Niigata.

Career
After attending Hannan University, Nakayama joined Giravanz Kitakyushu in January 2018.

Club statistics
Updated to 2 May 2021.

References

External links

Profile at J. League
Profile at Giravanz Kitakyushu
Profile at Albirex Niigata

1995 births
Living people
Hannan University alumni
Association football people from Yamaguchi Prefecture
Japanese footballers
J2 League players
J3 League players
Giravanz Kitakyushu players
Albirex Niigata players
Association football midfielders
People from Yamaguchi (city)